Marc Drillech is a French sociologist and President of a French private education group. He is the current Vice-President of IONIS Education Group, in France a private higher education group.

Biography
Graduating from Lille University of Science and Technology (Bachelor's degree in sociology) and from Institut d'Études Politiques de Paris (Master's degree), Marc Drillech started his career in 1980 as publicity manager at agence Feldman Calleux et Associés. After that, he became general manager of Mandarine. In 1990, he joined Publicis where he became Vice-President of Publicis Group.
In 2005, he moved to higher education by joining IONIS Education Group as Vice-President.

Bibliography
 Marc Drillech, Gérald Basseporte, Le boycott, le cauchemar des entreprises et des politiques, 1999, 
 Gad Drillich, L'adieu au calme : Juifs de France ou juifs en France, 2004,  
 Marc Drillech, Le Boycott. Histoire. Actualités. Perspectives, 2011,

References

Sciences Po alumni
Heads of universities in France
French sociologists
Living people
French male writers
Year of birth missing (living people)